Twice as Long, Half as Fast is an album released by Orlando group Indorphine. Its consists of 4 tracks, 2 being acoustic and the other two being instrumentals.

Track listing

Credits
 Jimmy Grant - Vocals
 Everett Sailor - Drums
 Adam Phillips - Guitar
 Buddy Fischel - Guitar
 Tanner Owings - Bass

References

External links
Official Myspace
Official Last.fm

2006 albums
Indorphine albums